Mohammed Kaghat (1942–2001) was a Moroccan playwright, actor and stage director. He also directed several feature films and wrote several books on drama and theater in Morocco.

Playwright and director
Mohammed Kaghat wrote and directed about thirty plays. Some of his plays were also published:
 L'impromptu shmicha lalla. Éditions de l'association Mohamed Kaghat des amateurs du théâtre national. Casablanca 2003.
 . Éditions de l'association Mohamed Kaghat des amateurs du théâtre national. Fès 2002.
 . Éditions de la Faculté des Lettres et des Sciences Humaines de Fès, 1993
 . Imprimerie Sebou Casablanca 1991
 . Revue Founoun (Maroc) n°1. 6th year 1979
 . Revue Âfak (Maroc) n°3. 1989
 . Journal Al alam attakafi (Maroc). June - October. 1991
 . Revue Drama (Maroc) n°1. 1992

Actor
Mohammed Kaghat acted in the following films and television series: 
1962 : "Lune de miel au Maroc" (honeymoon in Morocco) French-German production
1969 : "Soleil de printemps" (Sun of Spring) by Latif Lahlou.
1970 : "Wechma" by Hamid Bennani.
1991 : "La prière de l'absent" (the prayer of the absent) by Hamid Bennani.
1992 : "La nuit du crime" (the night of crime) by Nabil Lahlou.
1995 : "L'ouèd" (the river) by Hamid Bennani.
1995 : "La dernière balle" (the last bullet) by A. Mouline.
1996 : "Lalla hobbi" (miss love) by Mohamed Tazi.
1998 : "Ibn Batouta" (Ibn Battuta) by Hamid Basket.
1999 : "Assarab" (le mirage) by Hamid Bennani.
1999 : "Jésus" (Italian production) by Roger Young.
1999 : "Yacout" by Jamal Belmajdoub.
1999 : "Joseph" (Italian production) by Rafael Mertez.
2000 : "D’wayer zman" by Farida Bourkia.
2000 : "Hamassat" (murmures) (c. m.) by Mohamed Labdaoui.
2000 : "Maléna" (Italian production italienne) by Joseph Tornatore.
2000 : "Paul of Tarsus" by Roger Young.
2001 : "Moudawala" by Ksaïb.

References

Abd Allāh Shuqrūn, À la rencontre du théâtre au Maroc, 1998, p. 288

1942 births
2001 deaths
Moroccan dramatists and playwrights
Moroccan male writers
Male dramatists and playwrights
Moroccan male television actors
Moroccan male film actors
20th-century Moroccan male actors
21st-century Moroccan male actors
20th-century dramatists and playwrights
20th-century male writers